Asahikawa Dam is a gravity dam located in Akita Prefecture in Japan. The dam is used for flood control. The catchment area of the dam is 34.4 km2. The dam impounds about 35  ha of land when full and can store 5200 thousand cubic meters of water. The construction of the dam was started on 1967 and completed in 1972.

References

Dams in Akita Prefecture
1972 establishments in Japan